May Gorslin Preston Slosson (10 September 1858, in Ilion, New York – 26 November 1943, in Ann Arbor, Michigan) was an American educator and suffragist. She was the first woman to obtain a doctoral degree in Philosophy in the United States.

Life
May Gorslin Preston was the daughter of Reverend Levi Campbell Preston and the former Mary Gorslin. Her family moved to Kansas from New York State. She earned Bachelor of Science (1878) and Master of Science (1879) degrees from Hillsdale College in Michigan. In 1880 she became the first woman to earn a Ph.D. from Cornell University, and the first woman to obtain a doctoral degree in Philosophy in the United States. Her thesis was entitled Different Theories of Beauty.

After obtaining her PhD she became a professor of Greek at Hastings College in Nebraska, and was later Assistant Principal at Sabetha High School in Kansas. She married Edwin Emery Slosson in 1891 in Centralia, Kansas and moved with him in 1892 to Laramie, Wyoming, where he had been appointed professor of Chemistry at the University of Wyoming. Their son Preston William Slosson, born in Laramie in 1892, went on to have a long career as professor of History at the University of Michigan. A younger son, Alfred Raymond, died in childhood of scarlet fever. Preston's daughter, Flora May Slosson attended the University of Michigan as well.

May Preston Slosson organized a series of Sunday afternoon lectures for the prisoners at the Wyoming State Penitentiary in Laramie, to be given by University of Wyoming professors. She was also a speaker in the series. When the position of chaplain at the nearly all-male prison became vacant in 1899, she was appointed to the position at the request of the inmates and remained in the role until 1903. Her work at the prison is commemorated by the Dr. May Preston Slosson Historical Lecture Series held at the Wyoming Territorial Prison State Historic Site. She moved with her family to New York City in 1903.

While living in Wyoming, May Preston Slosson had enjoyed rights that other states denied to women, including the right to vote. After moving to New York, both she and her husband were active in the women's suffrage movement. In 1920 she published a book of poems, From a Quiet Garden, Lyrics in Prose and Verse.

See also
List of suffragists and suffragettes
Timeline of women's suffrage

References

External links
Mrs. May Slosson dies Obituary from Lawrence (Kansas) Daily Journal-World archived at Google News. Retrieved 15 November 2012.
May Genevieve Preston at Darlene's Family Genealogy Retrieved 15 November 2012.

1858 births
1943 deaths
American suffragists
Cornell University alumni
American philosophy academics
People from Ilion, New York
University of Michigan faculty
People from Sabetha, Kansas
People from Laramie, Wyoming
American women academics